Javier "Javi" Moreno Arrones Gil (born 16 May 2000) is a Spanish footballer who plays for Real Oviedo Vetusta as either a central defender or a right back.

Club career
Born in Oviedo, Asturias, Moreno was a Real Oviedo youth graduate. In August 2019, after finishing his formation, he was released by his club and subsequently joined Tercera División side CD Llanes.

Moreno made his senior debut on 15 September 2019, starting in a 0–0 away draw against Condal CF. He scored his first goal on 11 December, netting the opener in a 2–0 win at Club Siero.

On 5 July 2021, Moreno returned to his first club Oviedo, being initially assigned to the reserves in the Tercera División RFEF. He made his first team debut on 31 December, starting in a 2–0 success over SD Ponferradina in the Segunda División.

References

External links

2000 births
Living people
Footballers from Oviedo
Spanish footballers
Association football defenders
Segunda División players
Tercera División players
Tercera Federación players
Real Oviedo Vetusta players
Real Oviedo players